Barbara Wasinger is an American politician who was elected to the Kansas House of Representatives in 2018 as a Republican.

Prior to serving in the Kansas Legislature, she served as an Ellis County Commissioner, the first woman elected to the county commission. From 2005 to 2012 she served as a city commissioner in Hays, Kansas and served as Mayor of Hays from April 2008 to April 2009 and October 2010 to April 2012. While mayor, she served on the Hays Public Library Board.

2020-2021 Kansas House of Representatives Committee Assignments
Chairman of Joint Administrative Rules and Regulations
Vice Chairman of Higher Education Budget
Financial Institutions and Rural Development
Taxation

2019-2020 Kansas House of Representatives Committee Assignments
Financial Institutions and Pensions
Higher Education Budget
Taxation
Joint Administrative Rules and Regulations

References

External links
Vote Smart Barb Wasinger

Living people
Republican Party members of the Kansas House of Representatives
People from Hays, Kansas
Women state legislators in Kansas
Women mayors of places in Kansas
21st-century American women politicians
21st-century American politicians
Mayors of places in Kansas
County commissioners in Kansas
Year of birth missing (living people)
Place of birth missing (living people)
St. Catherine University alumni